Haywood County is the name of two counties in the United States:

 Haywood County, North Carolina 
 Haywood County, Tennessee